Angèle Bassolé-Ouédraogo (born 8 February 1967) is an Ivoirian-born Canadian poet and journalist. She has won the Trillium Book Award and been nominated for the Ottawa Book Award.

Biography
She was born in Abidjan, Côte d'Ivoire, and raised in Upper Volta. She was an avid reader as a child, and was encouraged by her local librarian who eventually taught her as his assistant, which allowed her access to more books than she would normally be allowed. She wrote her first poem around the age of 11 to 12, after being influenced by her brother Francis, who would go on to be a well known poet in Côte d'Ivoire. Her first published work was about Nelson Mandela while he was still imprisoned in South Africa, which was published by Jeune Afrique in France when she was 16.

She studied at the University of Ouagadougou and subsequently moved to Canada after she received a grant to do so, receiving a doctorate from the University of Ottawa and a journalism degree from the Université de Montréal. She is currently a researcher in women's studies at the University of Ottawa, and is developing a project to bring women's studies to African-based universities.

Her 2003 book Avec tes mots won the Trillium Book Award for French-language poetry, while Sahéliennes was nominated for the Ottawa Book Award in 2008 and was her first work to be translated into Portuguese. Between 2009 and 2012, she worked as an advisor in Burkina Faso on equal rights for men and women. She has created her own publishing house in Canada, Éditions Malaïka, which she aims to use to concentrate on African themes.

Bibliography

References

1967 births
20th-century Canadian poets
21st-century Canadian poets
Black Canadian writers
Burkinabé journalists
Burkinabé poets
Burkinabé women writers
Burkinabé women poets
Canadian women journalists
Canadian women poets
Canadian poets in French
Franco-Ontarian people
Ivorian poets
Ivorian women writers
Ivorian women poets
Journalists from Ontario
Living people
Writers from Ottawa
Université de Montréal alumni
University of Ottawa alumni
University of Ouagadougou alumni
Canadian book editors
Academic staff of the University of Ottawa
20th-century Canadian women writers
21st-century Canadian women writers
Black Canadian women
Ivorian emigrants to Burkina Faso
Canadian women non-fiction writers
21st-century Burkinabé people